A Gala Christmas in Vienna or Christmas in Vienna V is a DVD released in 1998. Plácido Domingo, Sarah Brightman, Helmut Lotti and Riccardo Cocciante perform traditional, European and American Christmas songs in Vienna, Austria. The orchestra was the Vienna Symphony, conducted by Steven Mercurio. The CD album of the concert reached No. 26 on the Austrian charts. It also charted in Germany, Belgium (in both Flanders and Wallonia), and the Netherlands.

Cast
 Plácido Domingo – singer
 Sarah Brightman – singer
 Helmut Lotti – singer
 Riccardo Cocciante – singer
 Steven Mercurio – conductor
 Wiener Symphoniker
 Gumpoldskirchner Spatzen
 Marlies King

Track listing 
A CD of the songs was also released.

CD 

 "Christmas Prologue" (medley of traditional tunes)
 "Deck the Halls"
 "The Closing of the Year" (from the Toys film score)
 "Tu scendi dalle stelle"
 "Walking in the Air"
 "Adeste Fideles" ("O Come, All Ye Faithful")
 "Away in a Manger"
 "An Old-Fashioned Christmas"
 "First of May"
 "Il Re Gesù" (by Plácido Domingo Jr.)
 ""
 "Cantemos Rapaces"
 "Christmas Is Here Again" (by Roger Whittaker)
 "Child in a Manger"
 "Angels from the Realms of Glory"
 "Another Christmas Song" (by Ian Anderson of Jethro Tull)
 "Santa Claus Is Coming to Town"
 "Happy Christmas (War is Over)"
 "Silent Night" (in 5 languages)
 "First of May" (Studio version) – (Bonus track)

Reception
Entertainment Weekly gave the video a C+, writing that "as long as gorgeous-voiced stars like Placido Domingo and Sarah Brightman stick to traditional fare like Deck the Halls and European carols, all is bright", and cautioned "but when Domingo bellows over Trevor Horn's bombastic The Closing of the Year, and Brightman attempts to rock on Santa Claus Is Coming to Town, they're just schlockin' around the Christmas tree."

CD chart performance

See also
 Christmas in Vienna
 Christmas in Vienna II
 Christmas in Vienna III
 Christmas in Vienna VI

References

External links 
 
 

Austrian musical films
1998 live albums
Live Christmas albums
1998 video albums
Plácido Domingo albums